Gerard Michael Lynch (born 15 June 1931) is a former Irish Fine Gael politician who served as a Senator for the Agricultural Panel from 1977 to 1981 and a Teachta Dála (TD) for the Kerry North constituency from 1969 to 1977.

A baker and farmer by profession, he was elected to Dáil Éireann at the 1969 general election. He was re-elected at the 1973 general election, but lost his Dáil seat at the 1977 general election. He was subsequently elected to the 14th Seanad Éireann as a Senator for the Agricultural Panel. He was an unsuccessful candidate at the 1981 general election.

References

1931 births
Living people
Fine Gael TDs
Members of the 19th Dáil
Members of the 20th Dáil
Members of the 14th Seanad
Politicians from County Kerry
Irish farmers
Fine Gael senators